The men's individual competition at the 2002 Asian Games in Busan was held on 11 October 2002.

Schedule
All times are Korea Standard Time (UTC+09:00)

Results
Legend
DNS — Did not start

Shooting

Fencing

Swimming

Riding

Running

Summary

 Qian Zhenhua was awarded bronze because of no three-medal sweep per country rule.

References

2002 Asian Games Official Report, Pages 488–500

External links
Results

Modern pentathlon at the 2002 Asian Games